Denys Chabot (born February 9, 1945 in Val-d'Or, Quebec) is a Canadian writer and journalist from Quebec. He is most noted for his novels L'Eldorado dans les glaces, which won the Prix Gibson in 1979, and La province lunaire, which won the Governor General's Award for French-language fiction at the 1981 Governor General's Awards. Eldorado on Ice, an English translation of L'Eldorado dans les glaces by David Lobdell, was also published in 1981.

He subsequently published the children's book Mooz le petit orignal (1986) and the novel La Tête des eaux, but concentrated the rest of his career primarily on writing books about the history of Quebec's Abitibi-Témiscamingue region.

Works
 L'Eldorado dans les glaces (1978)
 La Province lunaire (1981)
 Mooz le petit orignal (1986)
 Histoire de Val-d'Or des origines à 1995 (1995)
 La Tête des eaux (1997)
 L'Abitibi centenaire, 1898-1998 (1999)
 L'Abitibi minière (2002)
 Hector Authier, le père de l'Abitibi (2004)
 Le Village minier Bourlamaque (2009)

References

1945 births
20th-century Canadian novelists
21st-century Canadian historians
Canadian male novelists
Canadian children's writers in French
20th-century Canadian historians
Canadian newspaper journalists
Canadian male journalists
Canadian novelists in French
People from Val-d'Or
Writers from Quebec
French Quebecers
Living people
20th-century Canadian male writers
21st-century Canadian male writers
Governor General's Award-winning fiction writers